Freefonix is a children's animated television series created by Magnus Fiennes, Alex Tate and Simeon Warburton and co-produced by Cinnamon Entertainment, Toonz Animation-Trivandrum and Method Films for CBBC, in association with Isle of Man Film. The series launched on 4 January 2008 on BBC One with the first thirteen episodes; airing weekly up until 28 March 2008. The rest of the series was broadcast on CBBC from 18 December 2008 to 22 January 2009.

The series focuses on three musical 'Freewave' renegades that make up the fictional band of the same name. Using the power of the Thirteenth Note, a mystical musical energy source, they take part in musical battles against antagonist band Mantyz in order to keep their home city of Los Bosmos safe from the evil Sonic Lord known as Vox and the money-making schemes of Mya De Zya, the head of ComaCo, a record label and corporation who produce manufactured 'prepsi' musical acts.

Storyline
Freefonix have discovered a sophisticated way of fighting their battles against rival band Mantyz, by using the power of the Thirteenth Note, an awesome force that can bend space, time and minds when the perfect sound is created. When the two rival bands meet, the result is an explosive Soundclash, where the opposing forces do battle as all the energies of the Thirteenth Note are released.

Production
Freefonix features performances from singers Jamelia and Justin Hawkins, saxophonist and former cricketer Alastair Cook, actor Joseph Fiennes and musician Haylie Ecker. With a budget of more than £10 million ($15 million), Freefonix is the largest commission by BBC for an animation. The scripts for Freefonix were written in Los Angeles and Toronto, and story edited by Jeffrey Alan Schechter, Baz Hawkins and Will Schifrin.

Characters

Main

Freefonix
The protagonist "freewave" band who possess the power of the Thirteenth Note.
BB (voiced by Shelley Longworth) – 15-year-old lead singer, formally a member of the prepsi band BCD before becoming a Freewaver.
Freezbone "Freez" (voiced by Marcel McCalla) – 16-year-old guitarist and secondary singer/rapper with an outgoing and sometimes hippy personality. His guitar is named Misty.
Mostart "Mo" (voiced by Jules de Jongh) – 13-year-old beatmaker and DJ of the band, whose SoundShaper device acts as his mixer. Mo lacks confidence due to being the youngest member, and has a crush on Lady Lux.

Mantyz
The antagonist rock band who possess a corrupt version of the Thirteenth Note.
Kurtz (speaking voice by Adam Longworth, singing voice by Justin Hawkins) – 17-year-old self-absorbed lead singer and guitarist and Lady Lux's half-brother. His guitar is named Axe.
Lady Lux (voiced by Shelley Longworth) – 16-year-old bassist and Kurtz's half-sister. She is often the brains behind the band's schemes against Freefonix.
Hitt (voiced by Joseph Fiennes) – 17-year-old drummer and muscle of the band, whose clueless-ness often annoys the other members.

Other
Sugar Che (speaking voice by Susan Zelouf, singing voice by Jamelia) – A Sonic Lord who brought Freefonix together and acts as their guide and aid.
Vox (voiced by Adam Longworth) – A renegade Sonic Lord who Sugar Che trapped to the Void of Silencia and now seeks freedom through the schemes of Mya and Mantyz.
Mya De Zya (voiced by Susan Zelouf) – The vain head of ComaCo, a record label and corporation that produces manufactured prepsi music. She decides to help free Vox after he promises her "untold riches and power".

Recurring
CC & Dee Dee – BB's roommates and former bandmates from the prepsi girl group BCD. Like most prepsies, they are shallow and obsessed with pop culture.
Snugg Fitt & DJ Loose – Two DJs that work at The Bounce, a Freewave music club.
Mr & Mrs Start – Mostart's parents who are unaware that their loving nature towards their son is an annoyance to him.
Aw'right Jack – The owner of the diner Jack's Pies and Fries, where Freefonix often dine at.
Nerdry – A nerdy inventor who works at ComaCo and Mya's nephew, whom she despises. He creates equipment for Mya and Mantyz to use against Freefonix.

Production
Freefonix, created by Magnus Fiennes, Alex Tate and Simeon Warburton, is produced by Richelle Wilder and Chris Rice for Cinnamon Entertainment with Method Films and Toonz Animation. The series is directed by Jerome France and Pierre Alan Chartier, and features new tracks from Freefonix with some of the world's top record producing talents and features performances from Justin Hawkins (of The Darkness), singer Jamelia, and Joseph Fiennes, actor and brother of Magnus.

Episodes

Album

A soundtrack to the series was released on 26 January 2009, marketed as the self-titled debut studio album of Freefonix. The album features a handful of songs played in the series. A second album is said to be produced if there is enough interest.

Track listing

References

External links
 

 Freefonix YouTube channel
 Freefonix MySpace page
Variety article
Isle of Man film, show information

2000s British animated television series
2000s British children's television series
2008 British television series debuts
2009 British television series endings
British children's animated action television series
British children's animated fantasy television series
British children's animated musical television series
British computer-animated television series
English-language television shows
BBC high definition shows
BBC children's television shows
Animated musical groups
Fictional rock musicians
Musical groups established in 2008
British musical trios
British pop rock music groups
Television series by Method Animation
Teen animated television series